Soccer in the Sand is a series of beach soccer tournaments held at beach locations in eight different states throughout the United States and Australia. The tournaments feature competitors organized into teams of six-eleven members. The teams compete in one or two day tournaments, depending on location. The beach will be split into different soccer field for the tournament to be played on. This series was created in 2006. Chris Lemay is credited for the existence of these tournaments. Soccer in the sand tournaments also provide skills clinics the Friday before a tournament. Not only do they hold clinics, they also donate money to organizations locally of where the tournament was held. A tournament benefit is held and players are encouraged to bring the whole family and spend time on the beach. This tournament is becoming a very attended event. The tournament held at Grand Haven, Michigan hosts 20,000 people including players, coaches, and fans. The host's of the tournaments encourage everybody to come to the tournament.

Locations
Tournaments are held at the following locations:

 Kirra Beach, Gold Coast, Australia
Santa Barbara, California
San Diego, California
Clearwater Beach, Florida
Chicago, Illinois
Michigan City, Indiana
Detroit, Michigan
Grand Haven, Michigan
Muskegon, Michigan
Traverse City, Michigan
Rochester, New York
Cleveland, Ohio
Seaside, Oregon
Erie, Pennsylvania
Racine, Wisconsin

Format
The series is composed of fifteen separate annual tournaments of soccer played in the sand starting in early June and running through November. Each tournament features different competitors of soccer players that are grouped into different divisions and teams based on age, and gender. When registering the oldest player of the team is how it is determined what age group the team should be in. Females may play in either the female or male division, but boys may only play in the boys division. To be able to play for more than one team, the player must be playing on two teams in either different age groups, or different divisions. Each team can't have more than eleven players on it, unless it is a coed team, then the roster limit is twelve. Soccer in the sand consists of two tournaments that are either a one day tournament or a two day tournament depending on the location. Each team is guaranteed three games in the original bracket they are placed in. The time of the games varies depending on if it is a one day or two day tournament. For two day tournaments the games consist three eleven minute periods with two minute breaks between the periods. Meanwhile if it is a one day tournament games get two halves consisting of twelve minutes each with a two minute half time. The number of players on the field varies by location, some tournaments play a 6v6 including the goalkeeper and some are 5v5 including the goalkeeper. One player from each team will compete in either "rock, paper, scissors" or a coin toss to compete for the first kickoff or their choice of side to defend. If it is a two day tournament the referee will again flip a coin between periods two and three for the same thing to occur as it did at kickoff. The tournament is set up into different brackets. In the tournament the winning team of the game gains three points, a tie gets both teams one point, and the losing team receives zero points. In order to advance out of the original bracket and into playoffs the team must have the most points from their wins or ties. If two teams are tied on points to advance out of the bracket they can settle it by either a head to head, total goal differential of the tournament, or a shoot out.

External links
http://www.soccerinthesand.com/ (Official website)
https://web.archive.org/web/20150418060142/http://www.fcportland.org/tournament/soccerinthesand/index_E.html
http://www.grandhaventribune.com/article/sports/556061

References

Beach soccer competitions